Abyad, also transliterated abiad, is an Arabic word meaning 'white'. It may refer to:

Places
 Abu al Abyad (formerly Abu al Jirab), an island of the United Arab Emirates
 Hajar Abyad, a village in northern Syria
 Jeb Abyad-Byud, a Syrian village
 An Nīl al Abyaḑ, the Arabic name of the White Nile, river in Africa
 An Nil al Abyad, the Arabic name of the Sudan state of White Nile
 Ras al-Abyad/Ras ben Sakka, a cape in Tunisia, the northernmost point of the African continent
 Tell Abyad, a town in northern Syria
 Tell Abyad District, in Syria with Tell Abyad as its administrative centre
 Tell Abyad Subdistrict, in Syria with Tell Abyad as its administrative centre
 Tell Sabi Abyad, an archaeological site in northern Syria
 Wadi al-Abyad or al-Ubayyid, a wadi (valley) in Iraq
 Wadi Al Abyadh, a valley in Oman

Tell Abyad-related military events
 Battle of Tell Abyad (2013)
 Tell Abyad offensive (2015)
 Battle of Tell Abyad (2016)
 Battle of Tell Abyad (2019)

Other
 Abyad wa Aswad (lit. 'Black and White'), an Arabic political culture magazine published in Damascus

See also
 White Mosque (disambiguation) (Arabic: Masjid al-Abyad)